Wayne Township is a township in Jones County, Iowa.

History
Wayne Township was organized in 1856.

References

Populated places in Jones County, Iowa
Townships in Iowa